Cymbidium cochleare is a species of orchid native to the eastern Himalayas, China (South-West Yunnan), Taiwan.

References

cochleare
Orchids of Bhutan
Taxa named by John Lindley
Plants described in 1858